Karin Struck (14 May 1947, Groß Kiesow – 6 February 2006) was a German author. She won the Rauris Literature Prize and the Andreas Gryphius Prize. She had generally been seen as a writer of women's literature and to the Left. However, in 1991 and 1992 she expressed her opposition to abortion and regret at having had one. She has been described by one feminist source as "one of the most outspoken female writers who openly opposes abortion." In 1996 she converted to the Roman Catholic Church.

Selected works 
 Klassenliebe 1973
 Die Mutter 1975
 Lieben 1977
 Die liebenswerte Greisin 1977
 Trennung 1978
 Die Herberge 1981
 Kindheits Ende 1982
 Zwei Frauen 1982
 Finale 1984
 Glut und Asche 1985
 Bitteres Wasser 1988
 Blaubarts Schatten 1991
 Ich sehe mein Kind im Traum 1992
 Männertreu, München 1992
 Ingeborg B. – Duell mit dem Spiegelbild 1993
 Annäherungen an Ingeborg Bachmann 2003
 '' HARMONYTES [2012/2013]STUDENTS - SIREZ

Web sources

External links 
 
 
 Karin-Struck-Stiftung e. V. 

1947 births
2006 deaths
People from Vorpommern-Greifswald
Converts to Roman Catholicism
German Roman Catholics
German Communist Party members
Sozialistischer Deutscher Studentenbund members
German women writers
Writers from Mecklenburg-Western Pomerania